Elizabeth Jane Robertson  is a British developmental biologist based at the Sir William Dunn School of Pathology, University of Oxford. She is Professor of Developmental Biology at Oxford and a Wellcome Trust Principal Research Fellow. She is best known for her pioneering work in developmental genetics, showing that genetic mutations could be introduced into the mouse germ line by using genetically altered embryonic stem cells.  This discovery opened up a major field of experimentation for biologists and clinicians.

Education
Robertson earned her Bachelor of Arts degree from the University of Oxford. She received a PhD from the University of Cambridge in 1982 under the supervision of Martin Evans.

Career and research
After her PhD, she stayed on at the University of Cambridge for her postdoctoral fellowship and continued to work there as a research assistant following the completion of her fellowship. She was a professor first at Columbia University and then Harvard University before moving to the University of Oxford. In her lab at Columbia she was the first to show that embryonic stem cells carrying genetic mutations could contribute to all parts of the adult mouse body, including the cells that eventually make up the gametes, i.e. sperm and egg cells, allowing these mutations to be transmitted to the next generation. She used this approach to test the role of specific growth factors in embryonic development, and to screen for previously unknown genes that prevent normal development. Robertson's work was among the first to show that the disruption of many genes has surprisingly little effect on development and organismal phenotype, contributing to a long-running challenge in the understanding of the robustness of biological systems. She has also made significant contributions to the question of how the early embryo determines the anterior-posterior polarity that patterns the embryo from head to tail and the mechanisms that pattern the embryo from left to right.

Robertson currently serves as an editor of the journal Development. She serves on the editorial boards of Developmental Biology, Current Opinion in Genetics & Development, and Developmental Cell.

Awards and honours
 2016: Royal Medal "for her innovative work within the field of mouse embryology and development, establishing the pathways involved in early body planning of the mammalian embryo."
Fellow of the Royal Society, since 2003
Member of the European Molecular Biology Organisation (EMBO) since 2002
Wellcome Trust Principal Research Fellow
Chair of the British Society for Developmental Biology
Winner of the 2008 Edwin G. Conklin Medal (The Society for Developmental Biology)
Fellow at the David and Lucile Packard Foundation 1990–1995
Chair of General Motors Cancer Research Foundation
Sloan Prize Committee
Member of General Motors Cancer Research Foundation Assembly
Associate member of the European Molecular Biology Organization
2011 Member of Academia Europaea (MAE)
2011 Suffrage Science award 
2009 Waddington Medal
2007 Rockefeller University's Pearl Meister Greengard Prize
1992 The American Association for Cancer Research: Cornelius P Rhoads Award
1990–1995 Stohlman Scholar for the Leukemia Society of America
1990 Irma T Hirschl Career Development Award
1989 March of Dimes Basil O'Connor Starter Scholar Award

References

Living people
British geneticists
Fellows of the Royal Society
Female Fellows of the Royal Society
British women scientists
Alumni of the University of Oxford
Alumni of the University of Cambridge
Academics of the University of Oxford
Members of the European Molecular Biology Organization
Year of birth missing (living people)
Wellcome Trust Principal Research Fellows
British LGBT scientists
Developmental biologists
Foreign associates of the National Academy of Sciences